Jakub Bitman (born 22 July 1988) is a Czech badminton player.

Achievements

BWF International Challenge/Series 
Men's singles

Men's doubles

Mixed doubles

  BWF International Challenge tournament
  BWF International Series tournament
  BWF Future Series tournament

References

External links 
 

1988 births
Living people
Sportspeople from Prague
Czech male badminton players
Badminton players at the 2015 European Games
Badminton players at the 2019 European Games
European Games competitors for the Czech Republic